Claudia Mihaela Bobocea (born 11 June 1992) is a Romanian middle-distance runner competing primarily in the 1500 metres. She won the silver medal in the event at the 2023 European Indoor Championships.

Bobocea represented Romania at the 2016 Rio and 2016 Tokyo Olympics. She won multiple national titles both outdoors and indoors (mostly over 800 m).

Statistics

Competition record

Personal bests
 800 metres – 2:01.37 (Ostrava 2020)
 800 metres indoor – 2:04.58 (Bucharest 2016)
 1000 metres – 2:42.92 (Bucharest 2015)
 1000 metres indoor – 2:35.35 (Birmingham 2023) 
 1500 metres – 4:01.10 (Ostrava 2022)
 1500 metres indoor – 4:03.76 (Istanbul 2023)
 3000 metres – 8:55.34 (Osaka 2018)
 3000 metres indoor – 8:47.59 (Madrid 2019)

National titles
 Romanian Athletics Championships
 800 metres: 2017, 2018, 2019, 2021, 2022
 1500 metres: 2018
 4 × 400 m relay: 2017
 Romanian Indoor Athletics Championships
 800 metres: 2016, 2018, 2020
 1500 metres: 2015
 3000 metres: 2015

References

External links
 

1992 births
Living people
Romanian female middle-distance runners
Place of birth missing (living people)
Athletes (track and field) at the 2016 Summer Olympics
Athletes (track and field) at the 2020 Summer Olympics
Olympic athletes of Romania
World Athletics Championships athletes for Romania
Competitors at the 2015 Summer Universiade
Competitors at the 2017 Summer Universiade